Chemical City is the second studio album by Canadian musician Sam Roberts, released in Canada on April 11, 2006, and in the United States on May 16, 2006. The album debuted at number three on the Canadian Albums Chart, selling 10,000 units in its first week. The album was certified Platinum in Canada on May 17, 2018. The album had three singles: "The Gate", "Bridge To Nowhere", and "With a Bullet".

Critical reception

Jo-Ann Greene of AllMusic praised the album for capturing '70s classic rock in terms of packaging and tracks that are reminiscent of New Model Army, the Rolling Stones and Small Faces, calling it "a sumptuous helping of songs with strong melodies and anthemic choruses vying with more subtle, shaded pieces, all filled with meaty lyrics that are easily the equal of the music." Cory D. Byron of Pitchfork also commended Roberts for his stripped down singer-songwriter take on classic rock but was more favorable to the record's upbeat tracks than its slower-paced ones, concluding that, "Ultimately the ballads do more to weigh it down than lift it up, but Chemical City still has plenty to offer fans of old-fashioned rock."

Track listing 
All songs written by Sam Roberts.

2021 Re-release

Personnel
Adapted from the booklet of Chemical City.

Musicians
Sam Roberts - Vocals, guitars, keyboards, strings, co-producer
Dave Nugent - Guitars, backing vocals
Eric Fares - Keyboards, backing vocals, acoustic guitar
James Hall - Bass
Josh Tragger - Drums, percussion on tracks 1, 2, 3, 5, 6, 8, and 9
Bill Anthopoulos - Drums, percussion on tracks 4 and 7
Matt Mays - Vocals, guitar on track 5
Danielle Duval - Vocals on tracks 8 and 9
George "El Condor" Donoso - Additional drums on track 4

Technical staff
Joseph Donovan - Producer, co-producer, engineer
Mark Howard - Co-producer, engineer
Don Murnaghan - Studio assistant
Garnet Armstrong - Art director, design
Susan Michalek - Design
Ken Dewar - Illustrations
David Gillespie - Photography
Dave Spencer - Manager
Patrick Sambrook - Co-manager

Certifications

References

External links 
 Chemical City - Chemical City Official Site

2006 albums
Sam Roberts albums
Universal Music Canada albums